Jumanji is an American animated television series that was inspired by the movie based on the short story of the same name. The series ran for three seasons from 1996 to 1999. In 1996, it was carried by the UPN Kids network, but later seasons were syndicated by BKN. The series was also shown by CITV in the United Kingdom, TRTÉ in the Republic of Ireland and on Russian RTR channel. Over the course of three seasons, forty episodes were produced.

Series overview

Episodes

Season 1 (1996–97)

Season 2 (1997–98)

Season 3 (1998–99)

References

External links
 

Jumanji
Jumanji